Zootrophion (abbreviated Zo.) is a genus of 23 known species of orchid, native to Central America, South America and the West Indies. The stems have inflated, flattened sheaths. The flowers bear sepals that fuse at their tips to form box-like structures that resemble animal's heads, hence the generic name, which means "menagerie".

Species

References 

  (1982) Selbyana 7(1): 80. 
  (2004) Icones Pleurothallidinarum XXVI. Monographs in Systematic Botany from the Missouri Botanical Garden 95: 1–265.
  (2006) Epidendroideae (Part One). Genera Orchidacearum 4: 420 ff. Oxford University Press.

External links 

Pleurothallidinae
Orchids of Central America
Orchids of North America
Orchids of South America
Flora of the Caribbean
Pleurothallidinae genera